The Hathaway Manufacturing Company was a producer of cotton textiles founded in New Bedford, Massachusetts in 1888 by Horatio Hathaway, a China trader and whaler in the Pacific.

History
By 1917, the Hathaway Mills would grow to contain 108,000 ring and mule spindles and 3,400 looms  for the production of fine cotton goods, for which the humid seaside location of New Bedford was well suited.

In 1955, Hathaway merged with Berkshire Fine Spinning Associates of Adams, Massachusetts, and became known as Berkshire Hathaway.

By the 1960s, Berkshire Hathaway had declined to seven plants and 6,000 employees, but still annually produced one quarter of a billion yards of material that sold for more than $60 million. The assets, and a sizable amount of cash on the balance sheet, caught the eye of Warren Buffett, an up-and-coming but little-known investor from Omaha, Nebraska.

Through his Buffett Partnership Limited investment firm Buffett started buying stock in Berkshire at $7.60 a share. He eventually paid an average of $14.86 a share, or a total of $14 million, and took control of the company on May 10, 1965.
 
In 1985, the last textile operations were shut down. A portion of the mills, including the former office building were torn down January 14, 2014.

See also
Wamsutta Mills
List of mills in New Bedford, Massachusetts

References

Companies based in New Bedford, Massachusetts
Textile mills in the United States
Industrial buildings and structures in Massachusetts
Berkshire Hathaway
Defunct manufacturing companies based in Massachusetts